Bernard John Hayhoe, Baron Hayhoe,  (8 August 1925 – 7 September 2013) was a British Conservative politician.

Early life
He was born in Surrey and attended Stanley Technical School, South Norwood. He left school at 16 to take up an apprenticeship in a toolroom and studied at Borough Polytechnic. He then joined the Ministry of Supply as a weapons engineer in the armaments department and later moved to the Inspectorate of Armaments.

Political career
Hayhoe was elected the national chairman of the Young Conservatives in 1952 and left the civil service to contest Lewisham South at the 1964 election. He then worked for the Conservative Research Department. He was selected as the candidate for Heston and Isleworth for the 1970 election in place of Reader Harris, who was then facing criminal charges. Although Harris was acquitted before the election, Hayhoe remained the candidate.

Hayhoe was the Member of Parliament for Heston and Isleworth from 1970 until February 1974, then for Brentford and Isleworth from February 1974 until he retired at the 1992 general election. He had ministerial responsibility for the Army (1979–1981), the Civil Service Department (1981), the Civil Service (1981–1985) and the DHSS (1985–1986). He was on the moderate, left wing of the party and supported Michael Heseltine in his leadership challenge to Margaret Thatcher.

He was appointed as a Privy Councillor in 1985, knighted in 1987 and made a life peer on 21 August 1992 as Baron Hayhoe, of Isleworth in the London Borough of Hounslow.

References

Times Guide to the House of Commons 1987

Telegraph Obituary Lord Hayhoe

External links 
 

1925 births
2013 deaths
Alumni of London South Bank University
Conservative Party (UK) MPs for English constituencies
Conservative Party (UK) life peers
Knights Bachelor
Members of the Privy Council of the United Kingdom
UK MPs 1970–1974
UK MPs 1974
UK MPs 1974–1979
UK MPs 1979–1983
UK MPs 1983–1987
UK MPs 1987–1992
Civil servants in the Ministry of Supply
Life peers created by Elizabeth II